Jin Long (born 23 May 1981) is a Chinese former professional snooker player. He is nicknamed "Golden Dragon", which is a translation of his given name.

Career
He became professional in 2001 following his strong runs to the finals of the Asian and Chinese Championships. His first Main Tour stints were rather unsuccessful, with the best result a last 48 appearance at the 2004 Grand Prix. Jin has regained a Main Tour place by winning the 2008 Asian Championship, beating Aditya Mehta 7–3 in the final, having had spells on the tour on three previous occasions. He has been a regular wildcard in the China Open and he also competed in the 2008 Jiangsu Classic finishing above top players such as Shaun Murphy and Neil Robertson in his group, eventually finishing third.

2011/2012 season
Jin recorded the best ranking event finish of his career to date at the 2012 World Open, where he reached the last 16. He was selected to play in the wildcard round, where he beat Sam Baird 5–3 to qualify for the last 32 and a match up with compatriot Ding Junhui. Jin capitalised on his opponent's mistakes and won the match 5–1, but could not continue his run in the tournament in the next round as he lost 5–2 to Robert Milkins.
Long won his first event in the Invitational HK Spring Trophy. This event was organised by the same event organisers as the General Cup. Long beat Li Hang in the final.

2012/2013 season
Jin played in the wildcard round of the Wuxi Classic and Shanghai Masters this season, losing 5–3 to Jamie Burnett in the former. In Shanghai he saw off Jimmy Robertson 5–4, before Graeme Dott beat him 5–2 in the first round. He played in all three of the new Asian Tour events with his best finish coming at the Second Event where he was knocked out 4–2 in the quarter-finals by Cao Yupeng. This result was a major factor in him finishing 13th on the Order of Merit, high enough to receive a place on the main tour for the next two seasons.

2013/2014 season
Despite being able to enter qualifying for every ranking event in the 2013–14 season, Jin only played in the four Asian Tour events. He was beaten in the last 64 once and in the last 32 three times to finish 30th on the Order of Merit and 116th in the snooker world rankings. For the 2014–15 season, he didn't renew his WPBSA membership and was therefore no longer on the World Snooker Tour.

2014/2015 season
Jin played in two events during the 2014/2015 season, losing 4–0 to Ian Burns the opening round of the Haining Open and defeating Wang Heng 4–3 at the Xuzhou Open, before losing 4–2 to Mark King in the second round.

2015/2016 season
Jin only played in the Haining Open and lost 4–2 to James Cahill in the first round.

Performance and rankings timeline

Career finals

Non-ranking finals: 2 (1 title)

Pro–am finals: 1 (1 title)

Amateur finals: 3 (2 titles)

References

External links
 Profile on Pro Snooker Blog

Chinese snooker players
Living people
1981 births
Sportspeople from Liaoning
Asian Games medalists in cue sports
Cue sports players at the 2002 Asian Games
Asian Games silver medalists for China
Medalists at the 2002 Asian Games
21st-century Chinese people